East Buckland is a small village and former civil parish in the North Devon district of Devon, England, next to the village of West Buckland. The village has an Anglican church which is frequented by the nearby West Buckland School.

The civil parishes of East Buckland and West Buckland were merged on 1 April 1986, forming the civil parish of East and West Buckland.

External links
GENUKI page

References

Villages in Devon